Luis Manuel Quiñónez Castillo (born 5 October 1968) is a retired Colombian football midfielder.

He was born in Tumaco. Playing for Millonarios from 1988 through 1991, he then played for Once Caldas from 1992 to mid-1996 and Deportes Tolima through 1999. He stayed the first half of 2000 in Deportivo Pasto, then in Atlético Bucaramanga through 2002. In the 2004–05 season he resurfaced in Venezuelan Monagas SC.

He was capped 17 times and scored 3 goals for Colombia national football team in 1995, including at the 1995 Copa América.

References

1968 births
Living people
Association football midfielders
Colombian footballers
Colombia international footballers
1995 Copa América players
Millonarios F.C. players
Once Caldas footballers
Deportes Tolima footballers
Deportivo Pasto footballers
Atlético Bucaramanga footballers
Colombian expatriate footballers
Expatriate footballers in Venezuela
Colombian expatriate sportspeople in Venezuela
People from Tumaco
Sportspeople from Nariño Department